Slocombe may refer to:

Douglas Slocombe (1913 – 2016), British cinematographer
Louie Slocombe, Research Fellow in Quantum Biology
Marie Slocombe (1912 – 1995), British archivist, founded the BBC Sound Archive
Phil Slocombe (born 1954), English cricketer 
Sam Slocombe (born 1988), English football goalkeeper
Walter B. Slocombe (born 1941), former Under Secretary of Defense for Policy

Fiction
Mrs. Slocombe, character from the BBC One comedy show, Are You Being Served?

See also
Slocum (disambiguation)
Slocumb (disambiguation)